Apasovo (Apas) is a rural locality (a village) in Aptrakovsky Selsoviet, Meleuzovsky District, Bashkortostan, Russia. The population was 68 as of 2010. There is 1 street.

Geography 
Apasovo is located 21 km southeast of Meleuz (the district's administrative centre) by road. Belsky is the nearest rural locality.

References 

Rural localities in Meleuzovsky District